Francesco Stella (born 25 July 1991) is an Australian footballer who plays as a midfielder for Port Melbourne in the National Premier Leagues Victoria.

Club career

Early Years
Francesco Stella spent the 2007–08 season with the AC Chievo Verona youth team before returning to Australia to play for South Melbourne FC in the Victorian Premier League. Stella made his South debut against Altona Magic late in the 2008 season, when he replaced Fernando de Moraes. He made another substitute appearance against Richmond the following week before making a more consistent 19 appearances in 2009, scoring 2 goals. Stella was named as South Melbourne's U/21 player of the year for the 2009 season.

A.C Siena
In late 2009, he went to Italy where he was offered a three-year contract by Siena. Stella was part of the senior squad, at the time managed by Antonio Conte, although during his first year at the club he mainly played with the Primavera squad managed my Michele Mignani.

From 2011–2012, Stella went out on loan to Italian Lega Pro club U.S. Borgo a Buggiano 1920. Under head coach Gianluca Colonello, Stella made 21 appearances, scoring four goals and assisting 6 for the club before returning to Siena to begin the 2012/13 campaign.

Glasgow Rangers
He later moved to Scottish club Rangers for the start of the 2012–13, before returning to Australia with Melbourne Victory. He scored in a 3–1 friendly match win over  Falkirk at Ibrox Stadium.

Melbourne Victory
On 17 January 2013, it was confirmed that Stella had signed a -year deal with Melbourne Victory after impressing coach Ange Postecoglou, becoming their third signing of the summer, along with Jesse Makarounas and Scott Galloway. He made his debut for the Victory in The Big Blue match against Sydney FC, coming on as a substitute for Marcos Flores in the 76th minute of the match. The Victory ended up winning the game 3–1, courtesy of goals from Marco Rojas and Archie Thompson.

Stella spent the majority of the 2013–14 season playing in the National Youth League, scoring eight goals. Stella was released by the Victory in July 2014. He had made just seven appearances during his time at the Victory.

Sisaket FC

Stella signed for Sisaket FC for the start of the 2015 Thai Premier League season as their designated Asia quota player. Stella left the club at the end of the first leg of the season to pursue other options.

Avondale FC
In June 2015,  Stella signed a short-term contract with local club Avondale FC in the NPL Victoria. In his first game for the club he assisted two goals in a 3–0 away win over Port Melbourne SC. Stella scored 2 goals in his ten appearances for the club and was an important figure in keeping Avondale in the NPL.  In November 2015, Avondale confirmed that Stella had re-signed with the club for the 2016 NPL Victoria season.

Central Coast Mariners
In January 2016, Stella signed a one-year contract with A-League club Central Coast Mariners until the end of the 2015–16 A-League season.  After making eight appearances, Stella did not resign with the Mariners.

Nest Sotra Fotball
Stella signed a short-term contract with Norwegian Obos Liga Club Nest Sotra in until the conclusion of the domestic season on 31 October 2016.

Port Melbourne
Stella signed with Port Melbourne for the 2017 Victorian National Premier League season.

Career statistics

References

External links
 Melbourne Victory profile 
 

1991 births
Living people
Australian people of Argentine descent
Australian soccer players
Association football midfielders
Soccer players from Melbourne
Australian expatriate sportspeople in Scotland
Australian expatriate sportspeople in Thailand
Expatriate footballers in Thailand
South Melbourne FC players
A.C.N. Siena 1904 players
Rangers F.C. players
Melbourne Victory FC players
Central Coast Mariners FC players
Avondale FC players
National Premier Leagues players
A-League Men players
Francesco Stella
Australian expatriate sportspeople in Italy
Expatriate footballers in Italy
Australian expatriate sportspeople in Norway
Expatriate footballers in Norway
Expatriate footballers in Scotland
Australian expatriate soccer players